The 2010 UNLV Rebels football team was the 43rd varsity football team to represent the University of Nevada, Las Vegas. The Rebels played in the Mountain West Conference and compete each season against the remaining eight members of the conference and one permanent interstate rival: Nevada. The Rebels played a 13-game schedule due to their non-conference road game at Hawaii. The Rebels also had non-conference games against Wisconsin and at Idaho and West Virginia. Bobby Hauck was in first season as the head coach of the Rebels football program, having previously coached at the University of Montana. The Rebels played their home games at Sam Boyd Stadium in Whitney, Nevada.

The Rebels finished the season 2–11 (2–6 MW).

Pre-season
At the 2010 Mountain West Conference Media Day, UNLV was picked to finish eighth in the conference, due to their tough schedule which consisted of nine teams that went to bowl games in the previous season and included tough games with Wisconsin, at West Virginia, at Idaho, at Hawai'i and Nevada-Reno.  Also at the Media Day, junior wide receiver Phillip Payne was voted to the preseason All-Mountain West Conference team, marking the fourth consecutive season that a UNLV wide receiver had been selected to the preseason All-MWC team.

At the end of August 2010, linebacker Ronnie Paulo, safety Alex De Giacomo, offensive tackle Matt Murphy and center John Gianninoto were named as team captains for the 2010 season.  Less than a week before the start of the season, first-year head coach Bobby Hauck announced that junior Mike Clausen had beat out senior incumbent Omar Clayton for the starting quarterback position and would start in the season opener against Wisconsin.

Coaching changes
On November 15, 2009, the Las Vegas Sun announced that Mike Sanford would be let go as head coach following the completion of the season on November 28, 2009.  In five years as UNLV's head coach, Sanford posted a 16-43 overall record, a 7-32 record in the Mountain West and a 0-5 record against UNLV's arch rival, Nevada-Reno.  Sanford's overall winning percentage of .271 was the second worst in the program's history, only Jeff Horton's .228 (13-44 in five years) was worse.  Jerry Koloskie, at the time UNLV's interim athletic director, stated that Sanford's dismissal was a "performance-based issue"  In Sanford's five seasons as head coach at UNLV, the team didn't have a single winning season, with their best records under Sanford's tenure being back-to-back 5-7 records in 2008 and 2009. On December 22, 2009, Sanford was hired by new Louisville head coach, Charlie Strong, to be Louisville's offensive coordinator.

On December 22, 2009, newly hired athletic director, Jim Livengood, hired Montana head coach to become the tenth head coach in the program's history.  Hauck and former head coach Dennis Franchione were interviewed for the vacant position, Hauck on December 20, 2009 and Franchione on December 21, 2009.  Hauck would receive a second interview on December 22, 2009 to iron out contract negotiations.  Hauck's contract was for three years which would be a three-year contract with a $350,000 annual salary and $150,000 in completion bonuses.  Other coaches other than Hauck and Franchione that were rumored as candidates for the head coaching position were Jacksonville Jaguars defensive coordinator Dirk Koetter, Idaho's head coach Robb Akey and former Washington head coach Tyrone Willingham.

On January 4, 2009, it was reported that six of Hauck's assistants from Montana would join his staff at UNLV, including former offensive coordinator Rob Phenicie and defensive coordinator Kraig Paulson who took the same positions with UNLV.  Ty Gregorak was named recruiting coordinator and linebackers coach, Chad Germer (Offensive line), Dominic Daste (Tight Ends) and Cedric Cormier (Wide Receivers) were hired by Hauck as well.  Utah defensive backs coach J.D. Williams was hired by Hauck to be his assistant head coach, pass defense coordinator and defensive backs coach.  Currently, Hauck still has two vacant positions, but Hauck stated that filling those voids would not be an immediate priority.

Recruiting
Hauck met with most of the returning Rebels players within the first few days of his introduction as the new head coach and the players stated that they had quickly become fond of their new head coach.  Within a month, Hauck was able to receive commitments from high school prospects in Southern Nevada, a problem that plagued Sanford during his tenure.  Hauck was even able to get three star defensive end Ian Bobak who had originally committed to in-state rival UNR.

Schedule

References

UNLV
UNLV Rebels football seasons
UNLV Rebels football